This is a list of notable individuals born in Syria of Lebanese ancestry or people of Lebanese and Syrian dual nationality who live or lived in Syria.

Arts
 Colette Khoury - novelist and poet
 Rouwaida Attieh - singer

Religion
 Raymond Eid - priest
 Massoud Massoud - priest
 Elias Khoury Sleman - priest
 Joseph Tobji - priest

Politics
 Fares al-Khoury - politician and statesman

Sports
 Agop Donabidian - footballer

See also
List of Lebanese people
List of Lebanese people (Diaspora)
Lebanese people in Syria

References

Syria
Lebanese

Lebanese